The Thailand women's cricket team toured South Africa and Zimbabwe in August and September 2021. The team first played four one-day matches and three Women's Twenty20 International (WT20I) matches against the Zimbabwe women's cricket team, before playing five one-day matches and three twenty-over matches against the South Africa Emerging team.

Zimbabwe won the first one-day match against Thailand by seven wickets, with unbeaten half-centuries from Josephine Nkomo and Mary-Anne Musonda. Thailand won the second match by 22 runs to level the series, after a half-century and a five-wicket haul from Nattaya Boochatham. In the third match, Thailand batted first and were reduced to 14/5 inside nine overs, before Naruemol Chaiwai went on to score an unbeaten century. However, Zimbabwe went on to win the match by five wickets, with half-centuries from Chipo Mugeri-Tiripano and Modester Mupachikwa. Thailand won the fourth one-day match by five wickets, with the series being drawn 2–2.

In the WT20I series against Thailand, Zimbabwe won the opening match by one wicket, to record their fifteenth consecutive win in the format. Thailand won the second match by 53 runs to level the series, with Natthakan Chantham scoring an unbeaten 88. In the final match against Zimbabwe, Thailand won by 27 runs, winning the WT20I series 2–1.

In South Africa, the Emerging team won the first one-day match by 45 runs, with Thailand winning the next two matches to take a 2–1 lead with two matches to play. The South Africa Emerging team then won the fourth one-day match by 23 runs, to level the series with one game to play. The Emerging team won the fifth and final one-day match by five wickets to win the series 3–2. In the twenty-over series, the Emerging team won the opening match by 60 runs, with Khushi Mistry taking a five-wicket haul. Thailand won the second match by 30 runs to level the series with one match to play. Thailand won the final twenty-over match by seven wickets to win the series 2–1.

Tour of Zimbabwe

Squads

One-day series

1st one-day match

2nd one-day match

3rd one-day match

4th one-day match

WT20I series

1st WT20I

2nd WT20I

3rd WT20I

Tour of South Africa

Squads

One-day series

1st one-day match

2nd one-day match

3rd one-day match

4th one-day match

5th one-day match

Twenty-over series

1st twenty-over match

2nd twenty-over match

3rd twenty-over match

References

External links
 Zimbabwe series at ESPN Cricinfo
 South Africa series at ESPN Cricinfo

Thailand 2021
International cricket competitions in 2021
2021 in South African cricket
2021 in Zimbabwean cricket
2021 in women's cricket